Siobhan Redmond,  (born 27 July 1959) is a Scottish actress, a member of the Royal Shakespeare Company, and known for various stage, audio and television roles as Anne Marie in Two Doors Down.

Early life
Siobhan Redmond was born on 27 July 1959 in the Tollcross area of Glasgow as the second-eldest of three children to Charlotte Redmond, a drama teacher, and John Redmond, a university lecturer. She attended the Sunshine School of Dance and Park School for Girls in Glasgow's West End. 

Redmond studied at the University of St Andrews, where she earned a Master of Arts in English. At St Andrews University, she has said to have been 'discovered' by playwright Liz Lochhead while performing in a student Mermaids society production written by Marcella Evaristi. Redmond also did a course in massage and did a postgraduate year at the Bristol Old Vic.

Career
Her first television appearances were in the early 1980s, the first of these being in 1982 in the sketch show There's Nothing To Worry About! After appearing in the two series of Alfresco in 1983 and 1984, her first major television success was as George Bulman's assistant Lucy McGinty in Bulman (1985–1987). She played, among other roles, Maureen Connell in Between the Lines (1992–1994); Shona Spurtle in  The High Life (1994–1995); Madame Sin in In The Red BBC TV (1998) adaptation of the novel; Janice Taylor in Holby City (2000–2002), Sharon in The Smoking Room (2004–2005); Maeve Brown in EastEnders; clinical psychiatrist Pru Plunkett in Midsomer Murders; and Ailsa in Shoebox Zoo. She also appeared on radio including in the 2002 BBC Radio 4 series The Further Adventures of Sherlock Holmes and as Jean Brash in BBC Radio 4's McLevy series.

Redmond is also a stage actress, having starred in such theatre productions as The Prime of Miss Jean Brodie in 2003, and is a member of the Royal Shakespeare Company, with whom she appeared as Maria in Twelfth Night in 2007. She played Titania/Hippolyta for Shakespeare's Globe in A Midsummer Night's Dream, in its summer 2008 season.

In 2004, Redmond starred in the BBC TV series Sea of Souls as twin sisters Carol and Helen. Redmond appeared in the "Gingers for Justice" sketch on The Catherine Tate Show in 2005 and then again in 2006. In 2007 she joined The Bill as Crime Scene Examiner Lorna Hart and in 2010 played one of the leads in David Greig's play Dunsinane, reprising her role for the BBC Radio 3 adaptation on 30 January 2011.

On 26 June 2014, it was announced that Redmond would play a new incarnation of the Rani, a villainous character in the long-running series Doctor Who, originally portrayed on television by Kate O'Mara, who had died earlier that year. Redmond's version of the Rani is featured in BBC-licensed audio dramas by Big Finish Productions beginning with The Rani Elite, which was released in December 2014.

In November 2014 Redmond joined Alun Armstrong and William Gaunt in a production of Eugène Ionesco's Exit the King at the Ustinov Studio in Bath.

In 2018 Redmond appeared in three episodes in Series 3 of Unforgotten as Derran Finch

In 2019, Redmond appeared in the Acorn TV series Queens of Mystery as Jane Stone.

In January 2020, Redmond played the role of the Principal of Newnham College, Cambridge in the ITV series Grantchester.

In November 2022, Redmond joined the cast of Two Doors Down as Colin's new partner Anne Marie.

Honours
Redmond was awarded an honorary Doctor of Letters degree by her alma mater, the University of St Andrews, in 2000. She was appointed Member of the Order of the British Empire (MBE) in the 2013 New Year Honours for services to drama.

References

External links
 Siobhan Redmond recent performances, holby.tv; accessed 22 August 2014.
, accessed 6 November 2018

1959 births
Living people
Actresses from Glasgow
Alumni of the University of St Andrews
Members of the Order of the British Empire
Scottish soap opera actresses
Scottish stage actresses
Scottish television actresses
Scottish radio actresses
Royal Shakespeare Company members
Scottish women comedians
Audiobook narrators